The following list sorts countries and some territories by their exports of services. According to the World Trade Organization (WTO), service exports refer to the cross-border sale or supply of services by residents of one country to residents of another country.

Service exports can include a wide range of activities such as transportation, tourism, telecommunications, financial and insurance services, computer and information services, business and professional services, and many others. The WTO defines services broadly to include all economic activities other than the production and trade of physical goods.

List

See also

 List of countries by exports per capita
 List of countries by exports
 List of countries by imports
 List of countries by leading trade partners

References

 
Service export